María Sabina Hidalgo Pano (born September 20, 1999), better known as Sabina Hidalgo, is a Mexican singer and dancer. She was a member of the global pop group Now United, representing Mexico.

She became known after being signed by Simon Fuller, manager of the girl band Spice Girls,to join Now United, representing her home country.

Early life
Hidalgo was born in Guadalajara, Mexico, on 20 September 1999. At the age of two, she realized her desire to become a dancer. Her singing and love for reggaeton started when she heard Daddy Yankee's "Gasolina", then she began to take singing lessons.

Career 
In 2017, Hidalgo signed up to join the pop group Now United and established herself as one of the 14 finalists, and signed a contract with the record label XIX Entertainment. Hidalgo was introduced on November 21 of the same year as the group's Mexican representative, being the third to be announced.

In December of the same year, the group released their first single, "Summer In The City".

Personal life 
Hidalgo is currently in a relationship with Mexican footballer, Tepa González. They have been dating on-and-off since 2017. In 2021, Rumors started swirling that Sabina was expecting a baby. On February 24, 2022, Sabina confirmed the rumors and announced her pregnancy. In April, they announced they were having a baby boy. On August 5, 2022, Sabina announced she had given birth to a healthy baby boy named Enzo, who was born on August 4. She departed from Now United to take care of her son.

Filmography

Music videos

Documentaries

Discography

Awards and nominations 

At 20 years old, Hidalgo was the first Mexican in history to be nominated for MTV's VMA (Video Music Awards). She competed for the Best Group award with Now United.

References

External links 
 
 

1999 births
Living people
Mexican singers
Now United members
Singers from Guadalajara, Jalisco
Mexican dancers